|}

The Abingdon Stakes  is a Listed flat horse race in Great Britain open to fillies aged three years.
It is run at Newbury over a distance of 1 mile and 2 furlongs (2,012 metres), and it is scheduled to take place each year in June. Prior to 2018 its registered title was the Ballymacoll Stud Stakes and from  2003 to 2017 it was run as the Lord Weinstock Memorial Stakes in memory of Arnold Weinstock (1924—2002), a British businessman who owned the Ballymacoll Stud. The stud closed in 2017 and the race's registered title was subsequently changed to the Abingdon Stakes. In 2018 and 2019 the race was run as the Johnnie Lewis Memorial Stakes to commemorate Major Johnnie Lewis, a bloodstock agent who died in 2017.

Winners since 1988

See also 
Horse racing in Great Britain
List of British flat horse races

References

 Paris-Turf:
, 
Racing Post:

Flat horse races for three-year-old fillies
Newbury Racecourse
Flat races in Great Britain